In anatomy, a meatus,<ref
>Entry "meatus" in Merriam-Webster Online Dictionary.</ref> is a natural body opening or canal.

Meatus may refer to:
 the external acoustic meatus, the opening of the ear canal
 The internal auditory meatus, a canal in the temporal bone of the skull
 the urinary meatus, which is the opening of the urethra, situated on the glans penis in males, and in the vulva in females
 one of the nasal meatuses - the superior meatus, middle meatus and inferior meatus; each are passages through the nasal cavity within the skull

(The plural forms of "meatus" are: meatus, as a Latin form (of the fourth declension noun class, which the word belongs to); or meatuses, as a normally derived English plural; or often, and incorrectly, meati, by false analogy with the very common Latin -us/-i forms (such as alumnus/alumni), i.e., the second declension noun class.)

See also
 Meatal stenosis
 Fossa (anatomy)
 Foramen

References

Animal anatomy

pt:Meato